Phyllonorycter diversella is a moth of the family Gracillariidae. It is known from Nova Scotia in Canada and Connecticut, Ohio, Kentucky, Maine and Vermont in the United States.

The larvae feed on Gaylussacia species (including Gaylussacia baccata and Gaylussacia frondosa), Oxydendrum species (including Oxydendrum arboreum) and Vaccinium species (including Vaccinium corymbosum). They mine the leaves of their host plant. The mine has the form of a tentiform mine on the underside of the leaf.

References

diversella
Moths of North America

Lepidoptera of Canada
Lepidoptera of the United States
Leaf miners
Taxa named by Annette Frances Braun
Moths described in 1916